In April 2018, the ICC decided to grant full Twenty20 International (T20I) status to all its members. Therefore, all Twenty20 matches played between Luxembourg and other ICC members after 1 January 2019 will have T20I status.

This list comprises all members of the Luxembourg cricket team who have played at least one T20I match. It is initially arranged in the order in which each player won his first Twenty20 cap. Where more than one player won his first Twenty20 cap in the same match, those players are listed alphabetically by surname (according to the name format used by Cricinfo).

Luxembourg played their first match with T20I status on 29 August 2019 against Turkey during the 2019 Romania T20 Cup.

Key

List of players
Statistics are correct as of 31 July 2022.

References 

Luxembourg